Rangamati Hill District (Chakma:𑄢𑄋𑄟𑄖𑄴𑄳𑄠 ;) is a district in south-eastern Bangladesh. It is a part of the Chattogram Division, and the town of Rangamati serves as the headquarters of the district. By area, Rangamati is the largest district of the country.

Geography
Rangamati is located in the Chittagong Division. It is bordered by the Tripura state of India to the north, Bandarban District to the south, Mizoram State of India and Chin State of Myanmar to the east, and Khagrachari and Chittagong Districts to the west. Rangamati is the only district in Bangladesh with international borders with two countries: India and Myanmar.

The area of the district is 6116 km2 of which 1292 km2 is riverine and 4825 km2 is under forest vegetation.

History
Rangamati was a contesting ground for the kings of Tripura and Arakan. It was known as Reang/Riang Country before East India Company came. This region came under the Mughal Empire after the Muslim invasion in 1566. In 1737, Sher Mosta Khan, a tribal leader, took refuge with the Mughals. After this the Chakma settlement began along with various other settlements of varying ethnicity. From 1760 to 1761, this land was leased to the East India Company.

Demography

According to the 2011 Bangladesh census, Rangamati Hill district had a population was 595,979, of which 313,076 were males and 282,903 females. Rural population was 436,352 (73.22%) while the urban population was 159,627 (26.78%). Rangamati district had a literacy rate of 49.73% for the population 7 years and above: 56.42% for males and 42.36% for females.

As per the 2011 census, there were a total of 386,153 (64.79%) indigenous people in the district. The total population is divided into Bengalis and indigenous communities (ethnic minorities): Chakma, Marma, Tanchangya, Tripuri, Pangkhua, Lushai, Khiang, Murang, Rakhine, Chak, Bawm, Khumi.

Religious composition

As per 1991 census, the Religious institutions in district include  Pagoda 1230, Mosque 1059, Temple 65, Church 16. Genderwise, male constituted 53.59% and female constituted 46.41% of the population.

Administration

District Administration is the apex office of a district at the present context of administrative setting of Bangladesh. It is the management of affairs within a district, which is the basic territorial unit of administration in the country. It is at this level that the common man comes into direct contact with the administration. The district falls under the charge of a district officer, called either Deputy Commissioner or District Collector or District Magistrate. This officer acts as the representative of the central government at this level. Like other district administrations of the country, District Administration Rangamati, widely known as the Office of the deputy commissioner is the representative of the cabinet in the Rangamati Hill District.

 Deputy Commissioner (DC) & District Magistrate (DM): Md. Shamsul Arefin
 Chairman of Zila Porishod: Brisketu Chakma
 Chakma King:  Debashish Roy

Education
There are 291 government primary schools, 120 non-government primary schools, 22 junior schools, 6 government high schools, 45 non-government high schools, 2 government colleges, 13 non-government colleges, 61 madrasa, 7 technical schools, Rangamati Medical College and Rangamati Science and Technology University located throughout the district.

Subdistricts
The district of Rangamati consists of 10 upazilas, 1 municipality (9 wards and 35 mahallas), 50 union parishads, 162 mouzas and 1347 villages.

Upazilas

Economy
The economy of Rangamati is hugely dependent on agriculture with a total of 41.94% of the population employed there. Other occupational percentages are: agricultural labourer 12.06%, wage labourer 4.95%, commerce 8.22%, service 13.04%, fishing 2.02%, industry 4.57%, forestry 3.2% and others 10%. A grand total of 12275 hectares of land is used for cultivation, producing food and non-food crops such as rice, potato, corn, mustard seed, cotton and jute among others. Fruits such as mango, jackfruit, banana, pineapple, litchi, black berry are also grown in Rangmati.

Notable cottage industries of Rangamati are weaving, blacksmithing and wood work. Weaving is particularly famous for their woolen and jute rugs and hand loom cloth. Major industries include Chandraghona paper and rayon mill, Plywood Factory, Ghagra Textile and a Satellite Station at Betbunia amongst many others, producing and exporting goods.

Tourism

Kaptai lake

Kaptai Lake is a man made lake in south-eastern Bangladesh. It is located in the Kaptai Upazila under Rangamati District of Chittagong Division. The lake was created as a result of building the Kaptai Dam on the Karnaphuli River, as part of the Karnaphuli Hydro-electric project. The Kaptai Lake's average depth is 100 feet (30 m) and maximum depth is 490 feet (150 m). This lake was developed by inundating valleys and plain lands between the many hills.

Hanging Bridge
In Bengali the name of the Hanging Bridge is Jhulonto Bridge and this is also popular to its visitors. This hanging bridge is established on Kaptai Lake. This is the link way of Kaptai Lake. The total height of this bridge is 335 feet and is the landmark icon of Rangamati.

Kaptai National Park
Kaptai National Park cascades between the Karnaphuly and Kaptai Mountain assortments. Prior to announcement of the national park it was Sitapahar Reserve. It is about 57 kilometre from Chittagong city. In this park one can find plenty of old trees which were planted in 1873. In Kaptai National Park, there is various wildlife such as deer, jungle cat, elephant, monkey, etc. Many species of birds may also be of interest to tourists and bird lovers. Kaptai National Park is a safe and sanctuary for birds and other wildlife. The Forest Division founded picnic spots, and restaurants in this park.

Shuvolong Waterfalls
Shuvolong a place in Barkol sub district, located about 25 kilometres (11 kilometres as the crow flies) away from Rangamati town. There are few waterfalls in Shuvolong area with the largest one falling from as high as 300 feet. In the past several years, this place has turned into a tourist destination due to its waterfalls and nearby market. Shuvolong is accessible by speed boat or motor boats from Rangamati.

Sajek valley

 
Sajek is a union at Baghaichari Upazila in Rangamati districts. Basically it is name of a river which separates Bangladesh from India. The river flows into the Karnafuli River in the Chittagong Hill Tracts. Sajek Valley is situated in the North angle of Rangamati, near the Mizoram border boundary area. The valley is 1,800 ft high form sea level. Many small rivers flow through the hills - including the rivers Kachalon and Machalong. The main ethnic minorities on the valley are Chakma, Marma, Tripura, Pankua, Lushai. Marishsha is a name of a place near Sajek Valley. Most of the houses are made with bamboo. There is another place near Sajek, it is Kanlak, and it is known for its orange orchard.

Most attractions of the spot are sun set, rain, morning, evening, and night and aborigine people. Tourists can buy indigenous peoples' products from haat (markets). Roads are like big snake spirals on the mountains. Most of the people are Buddhist and others are Christian here. A new road has been built up to the Ruilui Para by the guidance of Bangladesh army. On the way traveller need to take permission from the army camp. Bangladesh army is very helpful and cooperative. Now mobile network is available here. The valley is in Rangamati but tourists can reach there from Khagrachhari, too. The route is Khagrachhori – Dighinala Bazaar – Bagaihat Bazaar – Machalong Haat – then Sajek. It is 62 km from Khagrachhari. Dighinala to Sajek is 40 km. Main transportation is Chander Gari.

There is another one tourist destination which is popular among tourists named "Konglak Haphong" which is the highest peak of the Sajek Valley. On the top of this hill, Lushai hills can be seen which is amazingly beautiful.

Love Point

Gallery

See also
Chittagong Hill Tracts

Notes

References

External links 

 Rangamati Hill District mapped on OpenStreetMap, retrieved 29 December 2021.
 Chittagong Hill Tracts mapped on OpenStreetMap, retrieved 29 December 2021. (inset are its three districts: Khagrachari, Rangamaai, and Bandarban)

 
Districts of Chittagong Division
Districts of Bangladesh
Districts of Bangladesh established before 1971
Chittagong Hill Tracts conflict
Tourism in Bangladesh